Orlin Hudson Smith  (October 19, 1865 – February 4, 1954) was a Major League Baseball outfielder who played with the Louisville Colonels in 1894. His minor league career lasted through 1899.

References

1865 births
1954 deaths
Louisville Colonels players
19th-century baseball players
Major League Baseball outfielders
Baseball players from Ohio
Oakland Colonels players
Houston Mudcats players
Montgomery Colts players
Memphis Giants players
Richmond Blue Birds players
St. Paul Apostles players
Springfield Ponies players
Syracuse Stars (minor league baseball) players
Springfield Maroons players
Allentown Peanuts players